A Universal Turing machine, often just called a universal machine, is an abstract computational device that can simulate other computational devices.

Universal machine may also refer to:

Programmable Universal Machine for Assembly
Machines made by Universal Gym Equipment
The Universal Machine, a mini-series of the Bureau for Paranormal Research and Defense comic books
The Universal Machine: Confessions of a Technological Optimist, a book by Pamela McCorduck
Universal measuring machine

See also
Santucci's Armillary Sphere, said to represent the "universal machine" of the world